Kalaleh may refer to:
 Kalaleh, Golestan, a city in Golestan Province, Iran
 Kalaleh, Kaleybar, East Azerbaijan Province
 Kalaleh, Khoda Afarin, East Azerbaijan Province
 Kalaleh-ye Olya, East Azerbaijan Province
 Kalaleh-ye Sofla, East Azerbaijan Province
 Kalaleh, Kurdistan
 Kalaleh County, in Golestan Province